Awvee Storey (born April 18, 1977) is a former American professional basketball player and assistant coach for the Connecticut Sun of the WNBA. He played the shooting guard/small forward position.

High school career
Born in Chicago, Illinois, Storey formed a relationship with Bennet Wang who ran an inner-city basketball league. Storey's mother relinquished Storey into Bennet Wang's care. Storey attended Proviso West High School in Hillside, Illinois, in 1996-97, he played for New Hampton Prep.

College career
Storey played his freshman season at the University of Illinois before transferring to Arizona State University, sitting out the 1998–99 season.

Storey was one of the top rebounders in the Pac-10, at only 6–6. He made an immediate impact and gave the young squad some veteran leadership despite being only a sophomore. Blessed with excellent athletic ability, Storey was able to defend guards, forwards and, when necessary, a center. He posted 16 double-doubles in his 85-game career. In 2000–01, he earned Pac-10 Honorable Mention honours, after posting career-highs in points (13.1) and rebounds (9.1), the latter a conference best.

Storey earned his bachelor of Interdisciplinary Studies degree with concentrations in communications and sociology at ASU. In the summer of 2001, he worked for Fox Sports Arizona as a production department intern.

NBA career
Awvee played in the NBA from 2004 to 2008. He played with the New Jersey Nets from 2004 to 2005, the Washington Wizards from 2005 to 2006, and the Milwaukee Bucks from 2007 to 2008.

On December 21, 2006, as a member of the NBA Development League's Dakota Wizards, Martynas Andriuškevičius sustained a serious head injury when he was punched by teammate Awvee Storey in an altercation during practice in Bismarck, North Dakota. The center suffered a fractured skull, severe concussion, and a two-centimeter hematoma (bruise) on the left side of his brain. Doctors initially thought it would be months before he could speak, but he was able to within a month, and stated his desire to play basketball within a year. Storey was suspended indefinitely. Days later he had his contract terminated and he was dismissed from the league. Andriuškevičius did not wish to pursue charges.

NBA career statistics

Regular season

|-
| style="text-align:left;"| 2004–05
| style="text-align:left;"| New Jersey
| 9 || 0 || 3.6 || .300 || .500 || .500 || .6 || .1 || .0 || .0 || .9
|-
| style="text-align:left;"| 2005–06
| style="text-align:left;"| Washington
| 25 || 1 || 4.6 || .390 || .429 || .571 || .9 || .2 || .1 || .0 || 1.7
|-
| style="text-align:left;"| 2007–08
| style="text-align:left;"| Milwaukee
| 26 || 0 || 10.0 || .438 || .000 || .483 || 2.1 || .6 || .3 || .0 || 3.5
|- class="sortbottom"
| style="text-align:center;" colspan="2"| Career
| 60 || 1 || 6.8 || .414 || .250 || .511 || 1.4 || .4 || .2 || .0 || 2.4

Coaching career 
In 2010-11, Storey was a video coordinator for the Washington Wizards. He joined the Washington Mystics in 2011. His task at the Mystics included assisting with scouting, workouts, and player development. After a seven-year stint with the team, he joined the Chicago Sky as an assistant coach in 2018. Storey worked as an assistant to head coach Jarell Christian with the Capital City Go-Go of the NBA G League in the 2018-19 season. On May 19, 2019, Storey was appointed as a video coordinator of WNBA's Connecticut Sun. He helped guide the team to the 2019 WNBA Finals and took over the role as the Sun's player development coach on January 3, 2020. In the 2021-22 season, he served as an assistant coach for the Maine Celtics of the NBA G League.

References

External links

Arizona State Sun Devils bio
NBA.com profile
NBA stats @ basketballreference.com

1977 births
Living people
American expatriate basketball people in China
American expatriate basketball people in Germany
American expatriate basketball people in New Zealand
American expatriate basketball people in South Korea
American expatriate basketball people in the Philippines
American expatriate basketball people in Venezuela
American men's basketball coaches
American men's basketball players
Arizona State Sun Devils men's basketball players
Barangay Ginebra San Miguel players
Basketball coaches from Illinois
Basketball Löwen Braunschweig players
Capital City Go-Go coaches
Chicago Sky coaches
Dakota Wizards players
Illinois Fighting Illini men's basketball players
Liaoning Flying Leopards players
Milwaukee Bucks players
New Jersey Nets players
New Zealand Breakers players
Philippine Basketball Association imports
Seoul Samsung Thunders players
Seoul SK Knights players
Shooting guards
Small forwards
Trotamundos B.B.C. players
Undrafted National Basketball Association players
Washington Wizards players
Wonju DB Promy players
Basketball players from Chicago